Pradeep Jain (born 22 May 1965) is an Indian former first-class cricketer and coach. He played for Delhi and Haryana between the 1986/87 and 2000/01 seasons. After retirement, he worked as a cricket coach.

Career
Jain was a slow left-arm orthodox spinner who played for Delhi for four seasons from 1986/87 to 1989/90, before his 11-year stint with Haryana. He appeared in a total of 93 first-class and 39 List A matches, some of them for North Zone and Board President's XI. He had a successful time during his career with Haryana, finishing as the leading wicket-taker of the 1993–94 Ranji Trophy with 46 scalps at an average of 17.69 including six five-wicket hauls and two ten-wicket hauls. He was the fourth highest-wicket taker of 1996–97 Ranji Trophy in which he took 44 wickets at 19.61 a piece. In the following Ranji season, he finished third on the wicket-takers list with 44 wickets to his name.

After retiring, Jain took up the job of cricket coaching. In 2005, he became one of the coaches of the National Sports Club of India's newly started cricket academy. He also became one of the coaches of the Dronacharya Cricket Foundation in Delhi started by Gurcharan Singh.

References

External links 
 
 

1965 births
Living people
Indian cricketers
Delhi cricketers
Haryana cricketers
North Zone cricketers
Indian cricket coaches
Cricketers from Delhi